Hoogstraal's gerbil (Gerbillus hoogstraali) is distributed mainly in southwestern Morocco.  There are thought to be less than 250 individuals in existence.

The specific epithet honors American entomologist and parasitologist Harry Hoogstraal.

References

  — Database entry includes a brief justification of why this species is near threatened

Gerbillus
Endemic fauna of Morocco
Rodents of North Africa
Mammals described in 1975
Vulnerable animals
Vulnerable biota of Africa